The Qaher-1 (Arabic: قاهر-1, meaning "Subduer-1") is originally a Soviet SA-2 missile that was developed locally by the Houthis to be a surface to surface missile that works on two stages, liquid fuel and solid fuel. It was unveiled in December 2015. The Houthis have also developed another variant known as Qaher-M2.

See also

 Burkan-2

References

Military intervention in Yemen
Tactical ballistic missiles
Tactical ballistic missiles of Yemen
Short-range ballistic missiles
Short-range ballistic missiles of Yemen
Surface-to-surface missiles
Surface-to-surface missiles of Yemen
Ballistic missiles
Ballistic missiles of Yemen
Guided missiles of Yemen
Theatre ballistic missiles